Coleophora voluta is a moth of the family Coleophoridae.

The larvae feed on the generative organs of Caroxylon tomentosum bungeanum.

References

voluta
Moths described in 1992